Thomas W. Blackwell IV (August 29, 1958 – August 22, 2017) was a Democratic member of the Pennsylvania House of Representatives, representing the 190th District from 2005 to 2008. He lived in Philadelphia, Pennsylvania and was a father of three, one daughter and two sons. Blackwell was commissioner, of the  Philadelphia Regional Port Authority; worked for the International Longshoremen's Association as a longshoreman, business agent and eventual president of Local 1332. He lost the 2008 primary election and was succeeded by fellow Democrat Vanessa Brown. He was the son of Lucien E. Blackwell and Gloria L. Blackwell. He was also the step-son of Jannie Blackwell. He died on August 22, 2017, at age 58.

References

External links
Pennsylvania House of Representatives - Thomas W. Blackwell official PA House profile (archived)
Pennsylvania House Democratic Caucus - Representative Thomas W. Blackwell official caucus website (archived)
Biography, voting record, and interest group ratings at Project Vote Smart

1958 births
2017 deaths
Democratic Party members of the Pennsylvania House of Representatives
African-American state legislators in Pennsylvania
Politicians from Philadelphia
International Longshoremen's Association people
20th-century African-American people
21st-century African-American people